In mathematics, an information source is a sequence of random variables ranging over a finite alphabet Γ, having a stationary distribution.

The uncertainty, or entropy rate, of an information source is defined as

where

is the sequence of random variables defining the information source, and

is the conditional information entropy of the sequence of random variables.  Equivalently, one has

See also
 Markov information source
 Asymptotic equipartition property

References
 Robert B. Ash, Information Theory, (1965) Dover Publications. 
zh-yue:資訊源
Information theory
Stochastic processes